Adrian Johnston may refer to:

 Adrian Johnston (musician) (born 1961), British musician and composer
 Adrian Johnston (philosopher), American philosopher